Thorek Memorial Hospital Andersonville, formerly Methodist Hospital of Chicago, is a nonprofit hospital located in the adjacent/overlapping Ravenswood/Andersonville  neighborhoods of Chicago, Illinois.  Thorek Memorial Hospital acquired Methodist Hospital of Chicago on October 1, 2019.

References

Hospitals in Chicago
Hospitals established in 1942
1942 establishments in Illinois